Scheduling software may refer to:

 Appointment scheduling software, software that allows businesses and professionals to manage appointments and bookings
 Meeting scheduling software, software that helps teams co-ordinate meetings considering multiple individual schedules
 Employee scheduling software, software that automates the process of creating and maintaining schedules for multiple employees
 Job scheduler, a computer application for controlling unattended background program execution of jobs

See also
 List of job scheduler software
 Schedule (disambiguation)
 Scheduler (disambiguation)